Queen Mary's Hospital is an acute district general hospital in Sidcup, South East London, serving the population of the London Borough of Bexley. It was once administered by Queen Mary's Sidcup NHS Trust established in 1993.

Following the dissolution of the South London Healthcare NHS Trust in 2013 it came under the management of Oxleas NHS Foundation Trust, with other services being provided by King's College Hospital NHS Foundation Trust, Lewisham and Greenwich NHS Trust, Dartford and Gravesham NHS Trust and Guy's and St Thomas' NHS Foundation Trust.

History 

The Queen's Hospital was opened in prefabricated buildings in the grounds of Frognal House on 18 August 1917. It provided pioneering plastic surgery under the guidance of Sir Harold Gillies to soldiers sustaining facial injuries during First World War.

It was re-opened as a general hospital known as "Queen Mary's Hospital" by Queen Mary in 1930. It was damaged by bombing during World War II and joined the National Health Service in 1948. The prefabricated buildings were replaced by more permanent structures between 1962 and 1974.

In April 2009 three NHS Trusts merged, those of Queen Mary's Sidcup, Queen Elizabeth Hospital and Bromley Hospitals as the multi-site South London Healthcare NHS Trust.

In November 2010 the hospital's A & E Department temporarily closed and the maternity services in the Kent Women's Wing. Acute services were transferred to the two sister hospitals, the Queen Elizabeth Hospital, London and the Princess Royal University Hospital in Farnborough.

In October 2013, the merged Trust was dissolved, and the hospital split between various other trusts. Oxleas NHS Foundation Trust became the owner of the estate and took responsibility for the running of some clinical services. King's College Hospital NHS Foundation Trust and Lewisham and Greenwich NHS Trust became responsible for running other clinical services at the hospital.

See also
 List of hospitals in England

References

External links
 Queen Mary's Hospital Sidcup
 NHS Choice Page

Hospital buildings completed in 1917
Hospital buildings completed in 1974
NHS hospitals in London
Buildings and structures in Sidcup